Jesse Bledsoe (April 6, 1776June 25, 1836) was a slave owner and Senator from Kentucky.

Life and career
Bledsoe was born in Culpeper County, Virginia in 1776. When he was very young, his family migrated with a Baptist congregation through Cumberland Gap into Kentucky. Many of the adults in this traveling congregation were property: Negro slaves. Jesse attended Transylvania Seminary and Transylvania University in Lexington, Kentucky, where he studied law. He was admitted to the bar about 1800 and commenced practice.

In 1808, Bledsoe was appointed Secretary of State. He was a member of the Kentucky House of Representatives in 1812. Afterwards he was elected as a Democratic Republican to the United States Senate and served from March 4, 1813, until his resignation on December 24, 1814. He then became a member of the Kentucky State Senate in 1817, serving until 1820.

Bledsoe was judge of the Lexington circuit in 1822. He settled in Lexington and was professor of law in Transylvania University. He then became minister in the Disciples Church. He moved to Mississippi in 1833 and to Texas in 1835. He died near Nacogdoches, Texas under circumstances his contemporaries and kinfolk could only describe as a significant fall from grace.

Sometimes a volatile being, he earned the sobriquet "Hot headed" Jesse Bledsoe. Besides being a brilliant jurist he was a fascinating maternal uncle to 1) Robert Emmett Bledsoe Baylor, who studied law with him, 2) Thomas Chilton who likewise represented Kentucky in Congress, and 3) William Parish Chilton who would rise to political prominence in Alabama and the Confederacy.

References

Sources

1776 births
1836 deaths
Kentucky lawyers
Kentucky state senators
Members of the Kentucky House of Representatives
United States senators from Kentucky
Transylvania University alumni
People from Culpeper County, Virginia
American Disciples of Christ
Secretaries of State of Kentucky
Democratic-Republican Party United States senators
Kentucky Democratic-Republicans
American emigrants to Mexico
People of Mexican Texas
19th-century American lawyers